Rok Mašina (trans. Rock Machine) is the 1981 debut and the only full-length studio album from Yugoslav hard rock and heavy metal band Rok Mašina.

Background
Rok Mašina was formed in 1980 by former Pop Mašina members Robert Nemeček (vocals and bass guitar) and brothers Zoran and Vidoja Božinović (guitars), with Vladan Dokić (drums). With Rok Mašina, Nemeček and the Božinović brothers turned towards heavier, less complex sound than Pop Mašina's progressive/hard rock sound with blues, psychedelic and acid rock elements. The band's debut album was recorded during June 1981 in Studio MS in Belgrade. Part of the album lyrics were written by Dragana Stanaćev and Koviljka Milić, actresses of the Teatar Levo (Left Theatre) theatre, and the album featured Ljuba Ninković (formerly of S Vremena Na Vreme) and Dragan Popović (formerly of DAG) on backing vocals. The album was produced by Nemeček. It featured new versions of the songs "Vatra" and "Bilo mi je bolje", released a year earlier on a 7-inch single. After the album release, Dragan Đorđević, a former member of Generacija 5, replaced Dokić. However, as at the time of the great popularity of new wave bands in Yugoslavia the future for the band did not seem very promising, they disbanded in 1982, in the midst of recording their second studio album. Part of the material recorded for the second album would be released in 1983 on the mini-album Izrod na granici.

Track listing

Personnel
 Robert Nemeček - bass guitar, vocals, production
 Zoran Božinović - guitar
 Vidoja Božinović - guitar
 Vladan Dokić - drums

Additional personnel
 Ljuba Ninković - backing vocals
 Dragan Popović - backing vocals
 Rade Ercegovac - engineer
 Slavko Timotijević - photography
 Jugoslav Vlahović - cover design

References

 Rok Mašina at Discogs

External links
 Rok Mašina at Discogs

Rok Mašina albums
1981 debut albums
Jugodisk albums